Quamichan Lake (Raven Field) Water Aerodrome  is located on Quamichan Lake,  north northeast of Duncan, British Columbia, Canada.

The airfield is owned and operated by John F Howroyd, who also owns Quamichan Lake (Raven Field) Airport.

See also
 List of airports on Vancouver Island

References

Registered aerodromes in British Columbia
Seaplane bases in British Columbia
Cowichan Valley